Baden-Powell is a surname. Notable people with the surname include:

Baden-Powell
 The Rev. Prof. Baden Powell (mathematician) (1796–1860), mathematician, clergyman and liberal theologian.
By his first marriage father of:
 Baden Henry Powell (1841–1901), English civil servant.
By his third marriage father of:
 Robert Baden-Powell, 1st Baron Baden-Powell (1857–1941), founder of the Scout Movement.
 Warington Baden-Powell (1847–1921), barrister and first head of the Sea Scouts.
 George Baden-Powell (1847–1898), politician, who also served in the Colonial Service.
 Frank Baden-Powell (1850–1933), barrister and artist.
 Agnes Baden-Powell (1858–1945), noted for her work in establishing the Girl Guides movement.
 Baden Baden-Powell (1860–1937), military aviation pioneer.
 Olave Baden-Powell (1889–1977), daughter-in-law and Robert Baden-Powell's wife, World Chief Guide.
 Arthur Robert Peter Baden-Powell, 2nd Baron Baden-Powell (1913–1962).
 Robert Crause Baden-Powell, 3rd Baron Baden-Powell (1936–2019).
 David Michael Baden-Powell, the current holder the title (born 1940).
 Baron Baden-Powell, an honorific title given to the head of the family.

Other people
 Baden Powell (guitarist) (1937–2000), Brazilian musician
 Baden Powell (malacologist) (1901–1987), New Zealand malacologist, naturalist and palaeontologist
 Baden Powell (politician) (1900–1955), Australian politician
 Baden Powell (footballer) (1931–2014), English footballer

See also

 Baden-Powell (book), a 1989 biography of Robert Baden-Powell
 Mount Baden-Powell, a peak in the San Gabriel Mountains of California named after Robert Baden-Powell.
 Baden-Powell House, a Scouting hostel and conference centre in South Kensington, London.
 Baden-Powell International House, a hotel and conference centre in Hong Kong.

 
 Baden (disambiguation)
 Powell (disambiguation)

References